Picciani is a surname. Notable people with the surname include:

Jorge Picciani (1955–2021), Brazilian cattle rancher and politician
Leonardo Picciani (born 1979), Brazilian lawyer and politician 
 (born 1986), Brazilian politician

See also
Piccinni